Maxisingle (stylized as "MaxiSingle") is the first extended play (EP) by Mexican recording artist Paulina Rubio, released on October, 1995, in Mexico and United States by EMI Mexico. A digitally edition was released on January, 2005. It contains seven tracks: "Pobre Niña Rica", main song by the Mexican telenovela of the same name, three remixes of "Te Daría Mi Vida", and others three remixes of "Nada De Ti", both songs previously released on Rubio's third studio album, El Tiempo Es Oro.

The EP was released alongside of Rubio's first compilation album Grandes Éxitos/Versiones Remix, only released in South America, which contained the greatest hits of Rubio and remixes version.

Track listing
The song "Pobre Niña Rica" was written and produced by Marco Flores. The remix versions of "Te Daría Mi Vida" and "Nada De Ti" were performed by Alejandro "Midi" Ortega

Source:

Personnel
Adapted from the album's liner notes.

Paulina Rubio – lead vocals

Miguel Blasco – arrangement, production
Marco Flores – engineering assistance, production, songwriter
Cesar Valle - songwriter
C Sanchez - songwriter
Alejandro "Midi" Ortega – mixing

References

1995 EPs